Teips  (also taip, teyp; Nakh тайпа taypa : family, kin, clan, tribe) are Chechen and Ingush tribal organizations or clans, self-identified through descent from a common ancestor or geographic location. It is a sub-unit of the tukkhum and shahar. There are about 150 Chechen and 120 Ingush teips. Teips played an important role in the socioeconomic life of the Chechen and Ingush peoples before and during the Middle Ages, and continue to be an important cultural part to this day.

Traditional teip rules and features
Common teip rules and some features:
 The right of communal land tenure.
 Common revenge for murder of a teip member or insulting of the members of a teip.
 Unconditional exogamy.
 Election of a teip representative.
 Election of a headman.
 Election of a military leader in case of war.
 Open sessions of the Council of Elders.
 The right of the teip to depose its representatives.
 Representation of women by male relatives.
 The right of the adoption of outside people.
 The transfer of property of departed to members of the teip.
 The teip has a defined territory.
 The teip constructed a teip tower or another building or natural monument convenient as a shelter, e.g. a fortress.
 The teip had its own teip cemetery.
 The teip hospitality.

List of teips 
Below is a list of teips with the chechen tukkhum to which it may belong.

Cheberloy tukkhum;
Achalo  ;
Nizhaloy;
Makazhoy;
Rigakhoy;
Buni;
Sharoy tukkhum;
Shotoy tukkhum; 
Varandoy;
Keloy
Ovkhoy tukkhum;
Melkhi tukkhum;
Nokhchmakhkakhoy tukkhum;
Allaroy;
Belgatoy;
Benoy;
Biltoy ;
Chartoy ;
Chermoy ;
Tsontaroy;
Elistanzhkhoy;
Engnoy;
Ersenoy;
Gendargenoy;
Gordaloy;
Gunoy;
Kharachoy;
Yalkhoy;
Zandkhoy;
Orstkhoi tukkhum (Russian: Орстхой);
Chantiy tukkhum;
Chanti;

 Tukkhum is not known / Without a Tukkhum;
Chinkhoy;
Dishni;
Marshaloy;
Mulkoy;
Nashkhoy;
Peshkhoy;
Satoy;
Turkoy;
Terloy tukkhum;
Khindkhoy;
Kalkhoy;
Yalkhoroy;
Zumsoy;
Zurzakkhoy.

As well as a list of teips included in the ethno-territorial Ingush societies Shahar

Dzhairkhoy Shahar;
Ahrievs;
Borovi;
Lyanovs;
Tsurovs;
Khamatkhanovs;
Gelathoy;
Fyappin Shahar;
Harphoy;
Salghoy;
Torshkhoy;
Korahoy;
Hamhy Shahar;
Khakhoy;
Egihoy;
Hamhi;
Targimkhoy;
Barahoy;
Barkinhoy;
Tumkhoy;
Barkhanoy;
Leimy;
Hulhoy;
Tskhoroy Shahar;
Ozdoi
Galashkarhoy Shahar;
Orstkhoy Shahar;
Gandala;
Tsechoy;
Galai;
Belharoy;
Merzhoy;
Guloy;
Chulkhoy Shahar;

Identity, land and descent
Teips being sub-units of tukkhums, members of the same teip are traditionally thought to descend from a common ancestor, and thus are considered distant blood relatives. Teip names were often derived from an ancestral founder. As is also true of many other North Caucasian peoples, traditionally Chechen and Ingush men were expected to know the names and places of origin of ancestors on their father's side, going back many generations, with the most common number being considered as 7. Many women also memorized this information, and keener individuals can often recite their maternal ancestral line as well. The memorization of the information serves as a way to impute clan loyalty to younger generations. Among peoples of the Caucasus, traditionally, large scale land disputes could sometimes be solved with the help of mutual knowledge of whose ancestors resided where and when.

A teip's ancestral land was thus held as sacred, because of its close link to teip identity. It was typically marked by clan symbols, including the clan cemetery, tower, and sanctuary. Land being scarce in mountainous Ingushetia and Chechnya, after the feudal system was overthrown, each teip claimed a definite area of land. Land boundaries were marked by stones with specific marks pointing to a local place of worship. While at first land was owned collectively, individual cultivation ultimately became the norm. In old Chechen and Ingush tradition, women were allowed to own land. The vehement Ingush and Chechen opposition to Soviet collectivization has been explained by the threat it posed to the traditional customs of land allotment.

Political function
Each teip had an elected council of elders, a court of justice, and its own set of customs. The civilian chief, referred to as the thamda or kh'alkhancha, chaired the council of elders. The baechcha, meanwhile, was the military leader.

Subdivisions
Brothers would share the same land and livestock.

Formation of new teips
The number of teips has been unstable in recent history. While there were 59 Chechen and Ingush teips in the early 19th century, this swelled to a hundred by the mid-19th century, and today there are about 170. New teips could be founded when a large  broke off and claimed the title of a full-fledged teip.

See also
Tukkhum
History of Chechnya
Medieval history of Christianity in Chechnya

References

External links
Teips on chechen.org (In Russian )
Russia and Eurasia Review (pdf)
Traditional social organisation of the Chechens (pdf)
A complete list of all Chechen Teips

Chechnya
Kinship and descent
Nakh peoples
Nakh culture
Tribes of the Caucasus